Kalyanpur is a village in the Bhopal district of Madhya Pradesh, India. It is located in the Huzur tehsil and the Phanda block.

It is located near Moondla, Teela Khedi and Dehriya Kalan, not far from the Sehore-Bhopal road.

Demographics 

According to the 2011 census of India, Kalyanpur has 19 households. The effective literacy rate (i.e. the literacy rate of population excluding children aged 6 and below) is 66.95%.

References 

Villages in Huzur tehsil